Sasha Abramsky (born 4 April 1972) is a British-born freelance journalist and author who now lives in the United States. His work has appeared in The Nation, The Atlantic Monthly, New York, The Village Voice, and Rolling Stone. He is a senior fellow at the American liberal think tank Demos, and a lecturer in the University of California, Davis's University Writing Program.

Biography
Abramsky was born in England to a Jewish family and was raised in London, in what Debbie Arrington described as "an accomplished and bookish family". He is the son of Jack Abramsky, a mathematician, and the grandson of Chimen Abramsky, a professor of Jewish studies at University College London, who was himself the son of Yehezkel Abramsky, a prominent Orthodox rabbi. He received a B.A. from Balliol College, Oxford in politics, philosophy and economics in 1993. He then traveled to the United States, where he earned a master's degree from the Columbia University Graduate School of Journalism. In 2000, he received a Crime and Communities Media Fellowship from the Open Society Foundations.

Bibliography

Books 
 Hard Time Blues: How Politics Built a Prison Nation. Thomas Dunne Books / St. Martins Press, January 2002 
 Conned: How Millions Went to Prison, Lost the Vote, And Helped Send George W. Bush to the White House. The New Press, April 2006 
 American Furies: Crime, Punishment, and Vengeance in the Age of Mass Imprisonment. Beacon Press (MA), May 2007 
 Ill-equipped: U.S. Prisons and Offenders with Mental Illness. Human Rights Watch, June 2007 
 Breadline USA: The Hidden Scandal of American Hunger and How to Fix It. Polipoint Press, June 2009 
 Inside Obama's Brain. Portfolio, December 2009 
 The American Way of Poverty: How the Other Half Still Lives. Nation Books, September 2013 
 The House of Twenty Thousand Books, a memoir of his grandfather, Chimen Abramsky. London : Halban, June 2014 
 Jumping at Shadows: The Triumph of Fear and the End of the American Dream, a study of irrational fear in the United States. Nation Books, September 2017

Awards
In 2000, Abramsky received the James Aronson Award for his Atlantic Monthly article "When They Get Out". In 2016, his memoir The House of Twenty Thousand Books, which describes the lives of his grandparents Chimen and Miriam Abramsky, received an honorable mention for that year's Sophie Brody Medal.

Personal life 
As of 2015, he lives in Sacramento, California with his wife Julie Sze, an American studies professor at University of California, Davis, daughter, and son.

References

External links
 
 older official site
 

1972 births
Living people
Journalists from London
British Jewish writers
British emigrants to the United States
Alumni of Balliol College, Oxford
Columbia University Graduate School of Journalism alumni
Writers from London
University of California, Davis faculty